The Labourer's Friend Society was a society founded by Lord Shaftesbury in the United Kingdom in 1830 for the improvement of working class conditions. This included the promotion of allotment of land to labourers for "cottage husbandry" that later became the allotment movement, which the Society campaigned for after the Swing riots of 1830 as "the most plausible remedy for the social problems of the countryside". It published the Labourer's Friend Magazine, and in 1844 changed its title to the Society for Improving the Condition of the Labouring Classes, becoming the first Model Dwellings Company in 1844.

The Society received support from many influential figures of the time, including Montagu Burgoyne, Sir William Miles, Mary Ann Gilbert and Lord Ashley, who was the primary influence behind the transition of the Society into a more powerful body. The new Society had the patronage of Queen Victoria, the Prince Consort as president and Ashley as chairman. The company's architect was Henry Roberts, best known for Fishmongers' Hall in London.

In 1959, the company became the 1830 Housing Society, which was taken over in 1965 by the Peabody Trust.

Buildings
Roberts's buildings made the SICLC a high-profile company with royal patronage and a display at the Great Exhibition; however, functional, utilitarian design of Roberts's buildings led to criticism that they were grim and unpleasant.

Buildings included:
Model Buildings, Bagnigge Wells, Pentonville for 23 families, and 30 aged women
George Street, Bloomsbury, for 104 single men
Streatham Street, Bloomsbury, for 48 families
76 Hatton Garden, for 57 single women
2 Charles Street, Drury Lane, for 82 single men
A small lodging-house also for men, in King Street, Drury Lane
Turner Court, Hull

See also
List of existing model dwellings

References

Organisations based in London with royal patronage
Housing organisations based in London
Philanthropic organisations based in England
Model dwellings
Organizations established in 1830
1830 establishments in England
Poverty in England
Working class in the United Kingdom